This is a list of the NCAA indoor champions in the short "high hurdle" event.  Generally that was the 60 yard hurdles until 1983, 55 meters 1984 to 1999, and the 60 meters being contested thereafter.  Hand timing was used until 1975, starting in 1976 fully automatic timing was used.

Champions
Key
y=yards
w=wind aided
A=Altitude assisted

60 yards hurdles

55 meters hurdles

60 meters hurdles

References

NCAA Men's Division I Indoor Track and Field Championships
NCAA Indoor track, men